SFZ or sfz may refer to:

 Sforzando, a dynamic marking in music
 Sforzando (band), a Celtic music band from Australia
 SFZ (file format), a plain text file format for instrument data in software synthesizers
 Slovak Football Association
 Sorong Fault Zone, a geological fault line in Western Pacific Ocean
 Star Fox Zero, a video game